Daniel Friedberg, better known by the stage name Freebo, is an American musician, singer-songwriter, and producer noted primarily for his work with Bonnie Raitt. He is also a session musician who has recorded and performed with Ringo Starr, John Mayall, John Hall, Aaron Neville, Dr. John, Willy DeVille, Crosby, Stills & Nash, Maria Muldaur, Kate & Anna McGarrigle  and many others.

His nine-year collaboration with Raitt (1971-1979) began when he attracted Raitt's attention as a member of Philadelphia's Edison Electric Band in the late 1960s.  Freebo was soon in great demand for studio work and touring.

In recent years, he has recorded five solo albums:  The End Of The Beginning (2000), Dog People (2002), Before The Separation (2006),  Something to Believe (2011), and If Not Now When (2015).

References

External links
 

20th-century American bass guitarists
20th-century American male singers
20th-century American singers
21st-century American musicians
21st-century American male singers
21st-century American singers
American tubists
Living people
Singer-songwriters from California
Singer-songwriters from Pennsylvania
Swarthmore College alumni
Guitarists from California
American male guitarists
21st-century tubists
20th-century American male musicians
1944 births
American male singer-songwriters